Alexander Kane (17 October 1897–unknown) was a Scottish footballer who played in the Football League for Portsmouth, Reading and West Ham United and in the Scottish Football League for Heart of Midlothian.

References

1897 births
Scottish footballers
Association football goalkeepers
English Football League players
King's Own Scottish Borderers F.C. players
Broxburn United F.C. players
Heart of Midlothian F.C. players
Reading F.C. players
Portsmouth F.C. players
West Ham United F.C. players
Year of death missing